National Good Neighbor Day is a national holiday in the United States celebrated on September 28.

In the early 1970s, Becky Mattson of Lakeside, Montana created National Good Neighbor Day as a day to connect with and recognize the importance of strong leaders.  On September 22, 1978, President Jimmy Carter signed Proclamation 4601 establishing September 24, 1978 as National Good Neighbor Day, stating that it should be observed "with appropriate ceremonies and activities."

On April 28, 2004, the Senate passed a resolution by Montana Senator Max Baucus to designate September 26 as National Good Neighbor Day.

Today, neighbors are adopting the "Good Neighbor Mindset" at NationalGoodNeighborDay.com and making where they live better.

References

Observances in the United States by presidential proclamation
1978 establishments in the United States
September observances